The tenth World Cup of Softball was held between June 29-July 5, 2015 in Irvine, California. The competing national teams were the United States, Japan, Canada, Mexico, Argentina, United States Junior Team, Puerto Rico and Venezuela.

Standings

Schedule
all times PDT

July 5, 2015

7th 8th places

6th 5th places

Bronze Medal Game

Gold Medal Game

References

World Cup of Softball
World Cup of Softball